The following is a list of  Leeds United F.C. records and statistics since its establishment in 1919.

Football League record 

1905 Elected to Division Two (Leeds City)
1919 Leeds City disbanded
1920 Elected to Division Two (Leeds United)
1924–27 Division One
1927–28 Division Two
1928–31 Division One
1931–32 Division Two
1932–47 Division One
1947–56 Division Two
1956–60 Division One
1960–64 Division Two
1964–82 Division One
1982–90 Division Two
1990–92 Division One
1992–04 FA Premier League
2004–07 Football League Championship
2007–10 Football League One
2010–20 EFL Championship
2020–present Premier League

Record attendance 
57,892 v Sunderland, FA Cup Rd. 5 replay, 15 March 1967

Record gate receipts 
£1,230,000.00 Leeds United v Manchester United, Premier League 12 February 2023

Record victories 
Overall: 10–0 v Lyn Oslo, European Cup Rd.1, 1st leg, 17 September 1969 
League: 8–0 v Leicester City, Div. One, 7 April 1934
FA Cup: 8–1 v Crystal Palace, Rd.3, 11 January 1930
League Cup: 6–0 v Leicester City, Rd.3, 9 October 2001
League Trophy: 3–1 v Grimsby Town, Quarter-Final, 10 November 2009
Europe: 10–0 v Lyn Oslo, European Cup Rd.1, 1st leg, 17 September 1969
Home: 10–0 v Lyn Oslo, European Cup Rd.1, 1st leg, 17 September 1969
Away: 9–0 v Spora Luxembourg, Inter Cities Fairs Cup Rd.1, 1st leg, 3 October 1967

Record defeats 
Overall: 1–8 v Stoke City, Div. One, 27 August 1934, 0–7 v Arsenal, Rd.2, Sept 4 1979 & 0–7 v West Ham United, Rd.3, 7 November 1966 & 0-7 vs Manchester City, Premier League December 14 2021 
League: 1–8 v Stoke City, Div. One, 27 August 1934
FA Cup: 2–7 v Middlesbrough, Rd.3, 2nd leg, 9 January 1946
League Cup: 0–7 v Arsenal, Rd.2, Sept 4 1979 & 0–7 v West Ham United, Rd.3, 7 November 1966
League Trophy: 2–4 v Rotherham United, Area 2nd Round, 8 October 2008
Europe: 0–4 v Lierse S.K., UEFA Cup, Rd.1, 2nd leg, 29 September 1971 & 0–4 v FC Barcelona, UEFA Champions League, 1st Group Stage, Matchday 1, 13 September 2000
Away: 1–8 v Stoke City, Div. One, 27 August 1934, 0–7 v Arsenal, Rd.2, Sept 4 1979 & 0–7 v West Ham United, Rd.3, 7 November 1966
Away 0-7 v Manchester City, Premier League Tuesday 14 December 2021

Sequence records

Most League goals 
Div. Two (98) 1927–28

Most League goals in a season 
John Charles (43) Div. Two 1953–54

Best undefeated start to a season 
(29) 25 August 1973 – 23 February 1974

Most matches undefeated 
(34) 19 October 1968 – 30 August 1969

Most home matches undefeated 
(39) 4 May 1968 – 28 March 1970

Most away matches undefeated 
(17) 19 October 1968 – 30 August 1969

Longest run without a home win 
(10) 16 January 1982 – 15 May 1982

Longest run without an away win 
(26) 18 March 1939 – 30 August 1947

Most League wins (dates inclusive) 
(9) 26 September 1931 – 21 November 1931

Most League defeats (dates inclusive) 
(6) 26 April 1947 – 26 May 1947

Most League matches without a win 
(17) 18 January 1947 – 23 August 1947

Most home wins 
(15) 24 January 2009 – 19 September 2009

Most away wins 
(8) 21 September 1963 – 28 December 1963

Most League goals in a career 
Peter Lorimer 168 (1965–79 & 1983–86)

Most goals in a match 
Gordon Hodgson: 5 v Leicester City, Division One 1 October 1938

Most capped player whilst at Leeds United 
Lucas Radebe (South Africa national football team) 69

Record transfer fee received 
£55,000,000 from Barcelona for Raphinha, July 2022
(Increasing to £63,000,000 with add-ons)

Record transfer fee paid 
€40,000,000 (£36,000,000) to 1899 Hoffenheim for Georginio Rutter, January 2023

Oldest player 
Eddie Burbanks (41 years, 23 days v Hull City, 24 April 1954)

Youngest player 
Peter Lorimer (15 years, 289 days v Southampton, 29 September 1962)

Most players used in a season 
 44 – 2006–07 season

League record club by club

This is the all-time record against clubs in the League.

Only completed season league results up to the end of the 2009–10 season are included.

Football League play-offs

FA Cup record club by club
This is the all-time record against clubs in the FA Cup.

Only completed FA Cup campaign results up to the end of the 2020–21 season are included.

League Cup record club by club
This is the all-time record against clubs in the League Cup.

Only completed League Cup campaign results up to the end of the 2016–17 season are included.

European record club by club
This is the all-time record against clubs in the European Competitions.

Only completed European campaign results up to the end of the 2002–03 season are included.

European Cup / Champions League

European Cup Winners' Cup

Inter Cities Fairs Cup

UEFA Cup

Other competitions record club by club
This is the all-time record against clubs in the other competitions.

Only completed competition campaign results not part of the above-mentioned competitions up to the end of the 2009–10 season are included.

Charity Shield

Full Members Cup

Football League Trophy

Penalty shoot-outs

Notes

Leeds United
Records and Statistics